The following is an overview of the year 2011 in Japanese music. It includes notable awards, lists of number-ones, yearly best-sellers, albums released, groups established and disestablished, deaths of notable Japanese music-related people as well as any other relevant Japanese music-related events. For overviews of the year in music from other countries, see 2011 in music.

Events
May 31 – July 18 – The First Japan Arena Tour (Girls' Generation)
December 31 – 62nd NHK Kōhaku Uta Gassen

Awards
June 25 – 2011 MTV Video Music Aid Japan
December 30 – 53rd Japan Record Awards

Number-ones
Oricon number-one albums
Oricon number-one singles
Hot 100 number-one singles
RIAJ Digital Track Chart number-one singles

Best-sellers

Artists
The following is a list of the 5 best-selling music artists in Japan in 2011 by value of sales, including sales of records and of DVDs and Blu-rays, according to Oricon.

Albums
The following is a list of the top 10 best-selling albums in Japan in 2011, according to Oricon.

Albums released
The following section includes albums by Japanese artists released in Japan in 2011 as well as Japanese-language albums by foreign artists released in the country during this year.
January 19 – Eight by Do As Infinity
January 26 – Go by Girugamesh
February 23 –  by Keisuke Kuwata
March 9 –  by Exile
March 23 – Brand-new idol Society by BiS
March 30 – 7 Berryz Times by Berryz Kobo
April 27 – Checkmate! by Namie Amuro
June 1 – Cherish by Seiko Matsuda
June 1 – Girls' Generation by Girls' Generation
June 8 – Echo by Nothing's Carved in Stone
June 8 – Koko ni Ita Koto by AKB48
July 6 – Beautiful World by Arashi
July 20 – Luv Songs by Che'Nelle
July 27 – C'mon by B'z
August 3 – Dum Spiro Spero by Dir En Grey
August 10 – Baby Action by Scandal
August 17 –  by SMAP
September 21 – After Eden by Kalafina
September 28 - DocumentaLy by Sakanaction
November 17 – Fight by Kanjani Eight
November 23 – Super Girl by Kara
November 30 – Republic of 2PM by 2PM
December 7 – Memories by Garnet Crow

Debuting artists

Deaths
Yoshiko Tanaka dies on April 21 from Breast Cancer.
Joe Yamanaka dies on August 7.

See also
 2011 in Japan
 2011 in Japanese television
 List of Japanese films of 2011

References